Philip Dudley Cezar (born December 1, 1952) is a Filipino former basketball coach, player and politician. Known by the monikers "Mr. Stretch", "Tapal King" and "The Scholar", he was part of the fabled Crispa Redmanizers ballclub of the Philippine Basketball Association that won two Grand Slams in 1976 and 1983. He was named the Most Valuable Player in 1980. He was also a many-time Philippine national team player in the 1970s.

PBA career
Coming from the JRU Heavy Bombers, some consider Cezar the best “thinking” power forward in the history of the PBA. He is the perfect example of a power forward with finesse, unlike contemporary "four" players like Marc Pingris, Eric Menk and Danny Ildefonso, and much earlier, Alvin Patrimonio and Nelson Asaytono, who rely primarily on sheer power and brute strength. Though barely 6'3" and less than 200 pounds, he was usually given the unenviable task of guarding tall imports from opposing teams.  On defense, his unusually long arms served him in good stead, using them in his famous "umbrella-like" defense and two-handed shot-blocks.  And though he played the No. 4 position for most of his career, he was like a second point guard on the floor, often orchestrating big plays and dishing out timely passes.  He could also run the floor and finish fastbreaks with his patented "stretch" lay-up.  He is best remembered as the very first one-on-one champion of the league when he defeated Ramon Fernandez in the finals of the 1979 Sprite One-on-One challenge where he won .

In 2000, he was named as one of the PBA's 25 greatest players of all-time in elaborate awards ceremonies that highlighted the 25th anniversary of the league.

In 2005, he was one of the twelve initial inductees to the PBA Hall of Fame alongside fellow Crispa players Atoy Co and Bogs Adornado, and Toyota stalwarts Robert Jaworski, Francis Arnaiz and Fernandez together with former PBA Commissioners Leo Prieto, Emerson Coseteng and Atty. Rudy Salud as well as legendary Crispa coach and team manager, respectively, Virgilio "Baby" Dalupan and Danny Floro, and the late anchorman Joe Cantada.

He finished his illustrious PBA career as the No.6 all-time leading scorer with 12,077 points behind Fernandez, Abet Guidaben, Patrimonio, Atoy Co and Asaytono. He also is the fifth all-time best rebounder with 5,834 total rebounds behind Fernandez, Guidaben, Jerry Codiñera and Patrimonio and was No. 2 in shotblocks with 1,370. He also had 3,130 assists (3.4 assists per game), 599 steals, converted 2066/2767 free throws in 28127:05 minutes played in 918 games. He, along with Fernandez, are the only two players in PBA history who has accumulated at least 12,000 points, 5,000 rebounds and 1,000 shot blocks.

Career highlights
Member of the 1976 and 1983 Crispa Grand Slam Team
1-time Most Valuable Player (1980)
7-time Mythical First Team Selection (1976, 1978, 1979, 1980, 1981, 1983, 1987)
2-time Mythical Second Team Selection (1984, 1985)
2-time PBA All-Star
4-time All Defensive Team Member (1985, 1986, 1987, 1988)
Member, PBA's 25 Greatest Players
Member, PBA Hall of Fame
Member, 5,000 & 10,000 points clubs
Member, 1,000 offensive rebounds club
Member, 2,000 defensive rebounds club
Member, 2,000 assists club
Member, 900 & 1,000 shotblocks clubs
Member, 500 steals club

Coaching career
After his retirement, Cezar went to coaching. He served as a long-time assistant coach to his former longtime rival Jaworski during the champion teams of Ginebra in the late 1980s and early 1990s.

In 2000, he coached the San Juan Knights to a championship in the now defunct Metropolitan Basketball Association beating the Negros Slashers in six games, 4-2.

In 2004, he was named commissioner of the Universities and Colleges Athletic Association for its third season. In 2005, he accepted the job as the new head coach of the Philippine School of Business Administration.

In 2013, he was appointed by then Manila mayor Joseph Estrada as head of Manila's sports council. He was the coach of the Manila Stars in the Maharlika Pilipinas Basketball League (MPBL). He held both positions until May 2019.

Political career
Cezar served as Vice Mayor of San Juan, Metro Manila under Mayor Jinggoy Estrada from 1992 to 2001. Months prior to the 2001 elections, he was appointed as Acting Mayor of San Juan while Estrada was serving his suspension due to plunder charges leveled against him and his father, former Philippine President Joseph Estrada. He retired from politics in 2001.

On October 8, 2021, Cezar filed his Certificate of Candidacy to run for Vice Mayor of San Juan in 2022 under Pwersa ng Masang Pilipino. He is the running mate of San Juan Knights team manager Felix Usman, who is running for mayor. However, he lost to incumbent vice mayor Warren Villa.

References

External links
https://web.archive.org/web/20121208072235/http://www.pba.ph/
https://web.archive.org/web/20051127095357/http://www.myglobe.com.ph/portal/forum/topic.asp?TOPIC_ID=3509
http://www.geocities.com/maong69/pba.cezar.html
http://www.teenfad.ph/news/archives/why25.htm
https://web.archive.org/web/20060317200024/http://www.turbochargers-pba.com/dinner.shtml

1952 births
Living people
Asian Games competitors for the Philippines
Barangay Ginebra San Miguel players
Basketball players at the 1974 Asian Games
Basketball players from Metro Manila
Centers (basketball)
Crispa Redmanizers players
Filipino men's basketball coaches
Filipino men's basketball players
Filipino sportsperson-politicians
Great Taste Coffee Makers players
Mayors of San Juan, Metro Manila
JRU Heavy Bombers basketball players
People from San Juan, Metro Manila
Philippine Basketball Association All-Stars
Philippines men's national basketball team players
Power forwards (basketball)
Shell Turbo Chargers players
Barangay Ginebra San Miguel coaches